Skull & Crossbones is a role-playing game published by Fantasy Games Unlimited in 1980.

Description
Skull & Crossbones is a pirate role-playing system set in the Caribbean during the late 17th century. The rulebook covers character creation, man-to-man and ship-to-ship combat, encounter tables, NPCs, and more. The game includes ship-deck plans in 25mm miniatures scale and a campaign map of the Spanish Main.

Publication history
Skull & Crossbones was designed by Gerald D. Seypura and Anthony LeBoutillier and published by Fantasy Games Unlimited in 1980 as a boxed set with two 32-page books, two maps, three cardstock sheets, counters, and special skull dice.

Reception
Aaron Allston reviewed Skull & Crossbones in The Space Gamer No. 35. Allston commented that "Skull & Crossbones might be useful as an introductory RPG for gaming beginners, but many others on the market are superior in that respect. We'll have to wait a while longer for adequate sea-going role-play."

Michael Blum reviewed Skull & Crossbones for Different Worlds magazine and stated that "Skull & Crossbones is a reasonable investment for the GM who wants to run a pirate campaign in the classic Caribbean period. The ship drawings and maps are very useful, while the rules themselves should provide at very least a strong base on which to construct a campaign."

Lawrence Schick called the game system "unimpressive".

References

Fantasy Games Unlimited games
Historical role-playing games
Role-playing games introduced in 1980